Carex balansae is a species of sedge native to Vietnam.

References 

balansae
Flora of Vietnam